This is the list of episodes for the CBS crime drama television series Close to Home. The series was first shown on October 4, 2005, and was broadcast for two seasons before being cancelled on May 16, 2007. The series follows Annabeth Chase, a deputy prosecutor in Marion County, Indiana, as she balances work with being a new mother.

Series overview
{| class="wikitable plainrowheaders" style="text-align:center;"
|-
! rowspan="2" colspan="2"|Season 
! rowspan="2" | Episodes
! colspan="2" |Originally aired
! colspan="3"| U.S. Ratings
|-
! First aired
! Last aired
!  Averageviewers (millions)
!  Rank
!  18–49 rating/share
|-
|bgcolor="#33335f" height="10px"|
| 1
| 22
| 
| 
| 10.41
|45
|2.8/8
|-
|bgcolor="#9B1C2C" height="10px"|
| 2
| 22  
| 
| 
|10.30
| 41
| 2.5/8
|}

Episodes

Season 1 (2005–06)
Season one consisted of 22 episodes and was broadcast between October 2005 and May 2006. After the fifth episode, "Romeo and Juliet Murders", CBS moved Close to Home from Tuesday 10pm to Friday 9pm, commonly called the Friday night death slot. When the show garnered its highest ratings to that point CBS announced that Close to Home would remain on Fridays.

Season 2 (2006–07)
Season two consisted of 22 episodes and was broadcast from September 2006 to May 2007. The main cast was changed with the start of the season after Christian Kane, who played Annabeth's husband, left the show because his character was killed by a drunk driver. David James Elliott joined the show as prosecutor James Conlon, replacing Steve Sharpe, who was played by John Carroll Lynch. Jon Seda and Cress Williams joined the cast as investigators Ray Blackwell and Ed Williams respectively.

References

External links
 

Close to Home